Fardad Farahzad (born 1 April 1986), is an Iranian-British journalist, TV Presenter and entrepreneur. He is the anchor of 24 With Fardad Farazad on Iran International. He is the founder of YourTime TV, a decentralized Satellite TV channel where users can upload their videos and choose a time slot to broadcast it. He worked for the BBC World Service from 2008 to 2018. He was a news presenter and reporter with the BBC Persian TV. He has anchored and covered many major Iranian and international stories for the network, including Iran's nuclear program, Arab Spring, the 2012 United States presidential election, the Brussels bombings, and the Nice truck attack.

Personal life 
Farahzad was born in Bandar Anzali, northern Iran, in 1986. He moved to the UAE in 2003 where he studied at Ajman University of Science and Technology.

References

1986 births
BBC newsreaders and journalists
BBC World Service people
BBC World News
Iranian journalists
Living people
Iranian emigrants to the United Kingdom